In Another Life is the fifth studio album by American singer and songwriter Bilal. It was released on June 30, 2015, by Entertainment One. Bilal recorded much of In Another Life with producer and songwriter Adrian Younge, who played most of the instruments on the album. Its cover art was designed by visual artist Angelbert Metoyer.

Release and reception 

In Another Life was released by Entertainment One on June 30, 2015, to generally positive reviews from critics. At Metacritic, which assigns a normalized rating out of 100 to reviews from mainstream publications, the album received an average score of 78, based on 8 reviews. Album of the Year, another aggregate website, gave it a 74 out of 100, which ranked it 11th among psychedelic soul albums featured on the website.

PopMatters critic John Paul hailed In Another Life as "a stone cold soul classic" and said it would prove to be perhaps "one of, if not the best R&B albums of the year". He applauded Bilal and Younge's retrofuturist approach to 1970s funk and soul on a wildly eclectic and "vital document from two of the most gifted, albeit idiosyncratic, performers R&B currently has to offer". AllMusic's Andy Kellman called In Another Life a hip hop soul high point and hailed Bilal as still "one of the most dynamic and progressive vocalists in contemporary music". In The Sydney Morning Herald, Paris Pompor categorized the album as neo soul while declaring the songwriting could be the best of the singer's career. Kristofer Lenz from Consequence of Sound was less impressed by the record, believing Younge's unrefined analog production had yielded mixed results. On songs such as "Star Now" and "Lunatic", "some instruments feel too high in the mix, typically the drums, and the ensuing chaos threatens to consume the rest", Lenz lamented. At the end of 2015, In Another Life was ranked number 13 on Rolling Stone magazine's list of the year's best R&B albums.

Track listing

Personnel 
Credits were adapted from AllMusic.

 Big K.R.I.T. – vocals
 Bilal – executive production, vocals
 Hannah Blumenfeld – cello, violin
 Danielle Brimm – A&R
 Dave Cooley – mastering
 Hans Elder – executive production
 Isabel Evans – A&R
 Paul Grosso – creative direction
 David Henderson – drums
 Davy Henderson – drums
 James Hunt – engineering
 Russell L. Johnson – executive production
 Kimbra – vocals
 Kendrick Lamar – vocals
 George Littlejohn – executive production
 Andrew Lojero – associate production
 Sean Marlowe – art direction, design

 Kawai Mathews – photography
 John McDonald – production management
 Angelbert Metoyer – cover art
 Victor Morante – production direction
 Ali Shaheed Muhammad – Fender Rhodes, Mellotron
 Loren Oden – background vocals, vocoder
 Clinton Patterson – trumpet
 Julia Sutowski – production coordination
 Jack Waterson – electric guitar, electric sitar, rhythm guitar, slide guitar
 Noah Wolf – violin
 Saudia Yasmein – vocals
 Adrian Younge – acoustic guitar, alto saxophone, baritone flute, baritone saxophone, clavinet, drums, electric bass, electric guitar, electric sitar, engineering, executive production, Fender Rhodes, flute, glockenspiel, Hammond organ, harmonica, mastering, mixing, percussion, piano, piccolo, production, slide guitar, synthesizer, tenor saxophone, vibraphone, vocoder

Charts

References

External links 
 

2015 albums
Bilal (American singer) albums
Albums produced by Adrian Younge